Monacanthus is a genus of filefishes.

Species
There are currently 2 recognized species in this genus:
 Monacanthus chinensis Osbeck, 1765 (Fan-bellied leatherjacket)
 Monacanthus ciliatus Mitchill, 1818 (Fringed filefish)

References

Monacanthidae
Taxa named by Lorenz Oken
Marine fish genera